Daniel Bois (born June 1, 1983) is a Canadian former professional ice hockey winger who played a solitary game in the National Hockey League (NHL) with the Ottawa Senators.

Playing career

Bois was drafted in the 3rd round, 97th overall in the 2001 NHL Entry Draft by the Colorado Avalanche. He played junior hockey for the London Knights of the OHL. He served as the team's Captain for several years.

Unsigned from the Avalanche, Bois signed with the Ottawa Senators on April 30, 2004. Bois played with affiliate, the Binghamton Senators, for five seasons playing in just one game with Ottawa in the 2006–07 season.

On July 20, 2009, Bois signed with the Chicago Blackhawks to a one-year contract. He was then assigned to AHL affiliate, the Rockford IceHogs for the duration of the 2009–10 season.

On July 23, 2010, Bois left North America and signed a one-year contract as a free agent with Austrian team EC Red Bull Salzburg of the EBEL. Upon extended his stay for a further season, Bois remained in the Austrian League for his third consecutive season after signing with Dornbirner EC on July 30, 2012.

After his third completed season in Austria, Bois opted to move to Germany and signed a one-year contract with EHC München of the Deutsche Eishockey Liga on May 10, 2013.

Bois enjoyed a brief stint in the Elite Ice Hockey League with the Sheffield Steelers before returning to the Austrian League, with the Vienna Capitals on January 27, 2015. He was later signed to a one-year extension to remain with the Capitals on May 15, 2015.

Career statistics

References

External links

1983 births
Living people
Binghamton Senators players
Canadian ice hockey right wingers
Colorado Avalanche draft picks
Dornbirn Bulldogs players
EHC München players
EC Red Bull Salzburg players
Ice hockey people from Ontario
Sportspeople from Thunder Bay
London Knights players
Ottawa Senators players
Rockford IceHogs (AHL) players
Sheffield Steelers players
Vienna Capitals players
Canadian expatriate ice hockey players in England
Canadian expatriate ice hockey players in Austria
Canadian expatriate ice hockey players in Germany